Half Price is a punk rock band from Cape Town, South Africa established in 2001. They are identified by energetic performances and released 3 full-length albums, two EP's, a compilation album, and a split album since their inception. The band have always maintained a DIY ethos, remaining independent until 2016 when they became the first South African punk band to sign with an American digital record label, Punk Outlaw Records. They are one of the longest standing punk acts in South Africa, with notorious impact on South African alternative bands.

History 
Half Price was found by Homo Pete and The DFG in 2001 as a punk rock outfit. Half Price plays a novel brand of drunk punk, a mixture of punk rock, ska & reggae. They carry the sarcastic leitmotif of music made for people that love to party. They are notorious for playing naked on stage, embracing the humor and reputation of the concept.

They have been banned from three Cape Town venues for their drunken behavior.

They have played numerous shows and festivals around South Africa, as well as four tours in Europe. They toured Europe for the first time in 2005, and then in 2006, 2008 and 2013. Half Price have shared the stage with acts such as The Exploited, Mad Caddies, The Spermbirds and Antimaniax. In November of 2007, Half Price were the supporting act for the Cape Town leg of the Alien Ant Farm South African tour.

On The Monotony of Monogamy, Half Price recorded a song called "Soccer 2010", about the 2010 FIFA World Cup.

Straight Outta South Africa is a compilation album that was digitally released under Punk Outlaw Records in 2016.

In 2018 they released a split album with Alive at Midnight, another punk band from Cape Town.

Band members
 Homo Pete - Vocals and guitar
 The DFG - Vocals and bass
 Emo Mawk - Guitar
 Kyle the Machine - Drums

Discography

Studio albums 
 Taking Life Seriously (2004)
 Banned (2006)
 The Monotony of Monogamy (2010)

Compilation albums 
 Straight Outta South Africa (2016)

EPs 
 Bush, Bin Laden & My Mom's Nought (2003)
 Programmed to Party (2013)

Split albums 
 So Hard it Hurts split with Alive at Midnight (2018)

Music videos
 Taking Life Seriously
 Suicide Bomber

External links 
 Half Price on Facebook
 Half Price on YouTube
 Half Price website
 Half Price on Bandcamp

References 

South African punk rock groups
Third-wave ska groups
Musical groups established in 2001
Musical quartets
Musical groups from Cape Town
South African musical groups